Vladimir Vladimirovich Semago (born 27 April 1947, Moscow, other data Harbin, China) is a Russian politician and businessman. Deputy of the State Duma of the first (1993-1995), the second (1995-1999) and fourth convocations (2003-2007, was a member since 2006). In the State Duma of the first and second convocations entered into a faction of the Communist Party (in the second part of the State Duma — until September 1998), in the State Duma of the fourth convocation —  the faction United Russia.  In 2016 he unsuccessfully ran for Duma from the Yabloko party. The president of the Energoprom Company.

Played a small role in the film by Stanislav Govorukhin  Voroshilov Sharpshooter (1999) and Not Вy Вread Аlone (2005), Tycoon (2002) by Pavel Lungin.

References

External links
 Дискуссия с Владимиром Рыжковым — Радио Свобода 25.08.2011
 Передачи на «РСН»

1947 births
Living people
Patriots of Russia politicians
Communist Party of the Russian Federation members
United Russia politicians
21st-century Russian politicians
Russian male actors
Yabloko politicians
First convocation members of the State Duma (Russian Federation)
Second convocation members of the State Duma (Russian Federation)
Fourth convocation members of the State Duma (Russian Federation)